Katlego "Mahoota" Mashego (born 18 May 1982 in Bushbuckridge, Mpumalanga) is a South African professional football (soccer) striker who most recently played for Premier Soccer League side Chippa United. He represented the South Africa national team on 22 occasions, scoring twice.

Mashego started his career at Hellenic FC and Silver Stars before moving to SuperSport United in 2006, where he won the Premier Soccer League in 2008.

He then moved to Orlando Pirates in January 2009 and captured his second league title in 2011.

Mashego was transferred from Orlando Pirates to Golden Arrows in 2011, with the player signing a 3-year deal.

He left Golden Arrows after only a single season and was signed on a free transfer by Moroka Swallows. Mashego finished the 2012-13 Premier Soccer League season as the league's top scorer with 13 goals.

Mashego joined Mamelodi Sundowns in August 2013 in a deal which saw Edward Manqele move in the opposite direction as a replacement on loan.

International goals

References

External links

 

1982 births
Living people
People from Bushbuckridge
South African soccer players
SuperSport United F.C. players
Association football forwards
Association football midfielders
Orlando Pirates F.C. players
South Africa international soccer players
Platinum Stars F.C. players
Lamontville Golden Arrows F.C. players
Moroka Swallows F.C. players
2009 FIFA Confederations Cup players
Mamelodi Sundowns F.C. players
South Africa A' international soccer players
2011 African Nations Championship players
2014 African Nations Championship players